The Greeks in Armenia, like the other groups of Caucasus Greeks such as the Greeks in Georgia, are mainly descendants of the Pontic Greeks, who originally lived along the shores of the Black Sea, in the uplands of the Pontic Alps, and other parts of northeastern Anatolia. In their original homelands these Greek communities are called Pontic Greeks and Eastern Anatolia Greeks respectively. Seafaring Ionian Greeks settled around the southern shores of the Black Sea starting around 800 BC, later expanding to coastal regions of modern Romania, Russia, Bulgaria and Ukraine. The Pontic Greeks lived for thousands of years almost isolated from the Greek peninsula, retaining elements of the Ancient Greek language and making Pontic Greek unintelligible to most other modern Hellenic languages. They were joined in the region by later waves of Greeks in the Hellenistic, Roman, and Byzantine period, ranging from traders, scholars, churchmen, mercenaries, or refugees from elsewhere in Anatolia or the southern Balkans.

Modern

Several villages with a large proportion of ethnic Greek Armenians are found in areas along Armenia's northern border with Georgia, in the northern part of the Lori marz (province). The largest communities can be found in Alaverdi and Yerevan, followed by Vanadzor, Gyumri, Stepanavan, Hankavan and Noyemberyan. Ethnic Greeks in Armenia numbered around 1,800 to over 4,000. Their numbers have been greatly reduced since the end of the Soviet Union due to emigration for economic reasons to other former Soviet republics and to Greece. Greeks and Armenians also live together in mixed communities north of the Armenian border in Georgia - but there too numbers have been greatly reduced due to emigration. Yaghdan in Lori Province has been described as the last remaining Greek village in Armenia.

See also
 Armenia–Greece relations
 Armenians in Greece
 Caucasus Greeks
 Greeks in Georgia
 Greeks in Azerbaijan
 Pontic Greeks

References

Ethnic groups in Armenia
Armenia
Eastern Orthodoxy in Armenia